Li Xifu (1909 – 29 May 1976) was a Chinese military officer who served as general in the People's Liberation Army.

He was a former deputy commander of the 13th Army of the Chinese People's Liberation Army. In 1955, he was awarded the rank of major general of the Chinese People's Liberation Army. He served as the Kunming Military Region Deputy Chief of Staff, Yunnan Military Region commander, and Shandong Province Military District commander. He died in 1976, at the age of 67.

References 

1909 births
1976 deaths
People's Liberation Army generals
Members of the 12th Central Committee of the Chinese Communist Party
Commanders of the Kunming Military Region
Deputy commanders of the Yunnan Military District